Bannock is a variety of flatbread or quick bread cooked from flour, typically round, which is common in Scotland and other areas in the British Isles. A bannock is usually cut into sections before serving.

Etymology
The word "bannock" comes from northern English and Scots dialects. The Oxford English Dictionary states the term stems from panicium, a Latin word for "baked dough", or from panis, meaning bread. It was first referred to as "" in early glosses to the 8th century author Aldhelm (d. 709), and its first cited definition in 1562. Its historic use was primarily in Ireland, Scotland and Northern England. The Scottish poet Robert Burns mentions bannock in his Epistle to James Tennant of Glenconner, in reference to Alexander Tennant.

Early history

The original bannocks were heavy, flat cakes of unleavened barley or oatmeal dough formed into a round or oval shape, then cooked on a griddle (or girdle in Scots). In Scotland, before the 19th century, bannocks were cooked on a bannock stane (Scots for stone), a large, flat, rounded piece of sandstone, placed directly onto a fire, used as a cooking surface. Most modern bannocks are made with baking powder or baking soda as a leavening agent, giving them a light and airy texture. There is a suggestion that bannock cakes played a pivotal role in the deciding of a person for human sacrifice during the late Iron Age in the discovery of Lindow Man.

Varieties
Bannock varieties can be named or differentiated according to various characteristics: the flour or meal from which they are made, whether they are leavened or not, whether they have certain special ingredients, how they are baked or cooked, and the names of rituals or festivals in which they are used. Historically, specially made bannocks were used in rituals marking the changing of the Gaelic seasons: St Bride's bannock for spring (February 1), Bealtaine bannock for summer (May 1), Lughnasadh or Lammas bannock for autumn harvests (August 1), and Samhain bannock for winter (end of October). Other special bannocks include beremeal bannock, bride's bannock, cod liver bannock, cryin' bannock, fallaid bannock, fife bannock, Hogmanay bannock, Marymas bannock, mashlum bannock, Michaelmas bannock, pease bannock, Pitcaithly bannock, salt bannock, sautie bannock, Silverweed bannock, St Columba's bannock, teething bannock, Yetholm bannock, and Yule bannock. Manx bonnag probably comes from the same root form as bannock and is made using similar ingredients. In the north of England, bannocks are often made using pastry rather than a bread dough.

Selkirk bannock
Selkirk bannock from Scotland is well-known and named after the town in the Scottish borders where it is traditionally made. It is a spongy, buttery variety, sometimes compared to a fruitcake, made from wheat flour and containing a very large quantity of raisins. The first known maker of this variety was a baker named Robbie Douglas, who opened his shop in Selkirk in 1859. When Queen Victoria visited Sir Walter Scott's granddaughter at Abbotsford she is reputed to have taken her tea with a slice of Selkirk bannock, thus ensuring that its reputation was enshrined forever. Today, Selkirk bannocks are popular throughout Great Britain, and can be found at most large supermarkets.

See also

 Damper
 Frybread
 Hardtack
 Thirlage ('bannock': payment of a handful of meal to a miller's servant)
 List of British breads
 List of quick breads

References

Further reading
 Barkwell, Lawrence J.; Dorion, Leah; Hourie, Audreen (2006). Métis Legacy (Volume II): Michif Culture, Heritage, and Folkways. Winnipeg: Pemmican Publications Inc. and Saskatoon: Gabriel Dumont Institute. .

External links

Welsh Bannock Traditions

Quick breads
Flatbreads
Deep fried foods
Scottish breads
Celtic words and phrases
Shetland cuisine